The Tunisian Volleyball League is the highest level of men's volleyball in Tunisia and it is organized by Tunisian Volleyball Federation. Tunisia Volleyball League is currently contested by 12 clubs since the season 2018-19.

The regular season is played by 12 teams, playing each other twice, once at home and once away from home. After the regular season, the six best-placed teams enter the play-offs and the last six teams enter the play-out.

2021–22 Nationale A teams

Promoted: CS Hammam Lif V.C.
Relegated: US Carthage

List of champions

Titles by club

Notable foreign players

See also 
 Tunisian Women's Volleyball League

References

External links
Tunisian Volleyball Federation 

Tunisia
League
Volleyball competitions in Tunisia